George Henry Hirst (17 May 1879 – 13 November 1933, Darfield, South Yorkshire) was a British politician.

Born in Elsecar, Hirst became a miner and, later, a checkweighman at the Dearne Valley Colliery.  He joined the Yorkshire Miners' Association, and served on its council.  He joined the Labour Party, and was elected to Darfield Urban District Council, becoming its chair, and also served as a magistrate.

At the 1918 UK general election, Hirst was as Member of Parliament for the new constituency of Wentworth.  He held the seat until his death, aged 54, in 1933.

Hirst married twice and had 16 children, 12 by his second wife.

References

1879 births
1933 deaths
UK MPs 1918–1922
UK MPs 1922–1923
UK MPs 1923–1924
UK MPs 1924–1929
UK MPs 1929–1931
UK MPs 1931–1935
Councillors in South Yorkshire
Labour Party (UK) MPs for English constituencies
Miners' Federation of Great Britain-sponsored MPs
Trade unionists from Yorkshire